Walter Newman may refer to
 Walter Newman (screenwriter), American radio writer and screenwriter
 Walter Stephenson Newman, president of Virginia Tech
 Walter Newman (civic figure) (died 2012), central figure in the cultural development of San Francisco, California